Anielin  is a village in the administrative district of Gmina Okonek, within Złotów County, Greater Poland Voivodeship, in west-central Poland.

For more on its history, see Złotów County.

References

Villages in Złotów County